Julian "Jools" Jameson (born in Sunderland, England in the Summer of 1968) is the CEO of Greenhill EnviroTechnologies Inc. based in Nova Scotia Canada, having previously worked in England (where he was known as 'Jools') as a computer game developer, designer and producer.

Greenhill EnviroTechnologies Inc. 
Julian currently runs Greenhill EnviroTechnologies Inc., which designs and develops electronic control systems for green technologies. The company's current Okapi product line, of sophisticated control systems for solar collectors, is featured on the Kickstarter website.

Okapi Product Line 
 Okapi: a sophisticated control system for solar collector air heaters.
 Okapi 2: controller for two side-by-side solar collector air heaters (or one very large collector).
 Okapi 2.i: controller for two independent solar collectors.

External links 
 Greenhill EnviroTechnologies Inc.: Website
 Greenhill EnviroTechnologies Inc.: YouTube Channel
 Kickstarter: Okapi Product Line

Gaming career 
Jools' gaming career spanned some 20 years starting in the early days of gaming "messing around" with machine code on the 6502-based Oric 1 and has programmed almost every home computer and console since.

The most prominent game of his career is Cannon Fodder, which he co-designed and programmed.  Cannon Fodder 2 followed and, later in his career,  he converted it onto the Game Boy platform (a project he initiated). This conversion included an FMV player, which he both designed and programmed, capable of streaming digital video and audio.  The Game Boy conversion received a BAFTA nomination for sound and high review scores, including 93% from Official Nintendo Magazine and 96% from Nintendo Power.

Games programmed, designed, and produced

External links 
 Lemon Amiga games
 MSN: The decline of the British gaming industry
 Gamespot GameFaqs: WWF WrestleMania
 Gamespot WWF WrestleMania Tech Info
 Hall of Light: Seconds Out
 Very Special Cannon Fodder
 Answers: Croc of the Gobbos
 IGN: Cannon Fodder on Game Boy Color
 G-Police
 Tynesoft Boys Club
 Hall of Light: Frost Byte
 UVL Cannon Fodder
 Atari Legend: Seconds Out
 Classic Amiga: Frost Byte
 UVL Game List: 3D Ghost Chase
 Retro Game Reviews: Cannon Fodder

1968 births
Living people
British video game designers